Elections to Antrim Borough Council were held on 19 May 1993 on the same day as the other Northern Irish local government elections. The election used three district electoral areas to elect a total of 19 councillors.

Election results

Note: "Votes" are the first preference votes.

Districts summary

|- class="unsortable" align="centre"
!rowspan=2 align="left"|Ward
! % 
!Cllrs
! % 
!Cllrs
! %
!Cllrs
! %
!Cllrs
! % 
!Cllrs
! %
!Cllrs
!rowspan=2|TotalCllrs
|- class="unsortable" align="center"
!colspan=2 bgcolor="" | UUP
!colspan=2 bgcolor="" | SDLP
!colspan=2 bgcolor="" | DUP
!colspan=2 bgcolor="" | Alliance
!colspan=2 bgcolor="" | Sinn Féin
!colspan=2 bgcolor="white"| Others
|-
|align="left"|Antrim North West
|32.6
|1
|bgcolor="#99FF66"|36.1
|bgcolor="#99FF66"|2
|17.0
|1
|0.0
|0
|14.3
|1
|0.0
|0
|5
|-
|align="left"|Antrim South East
|bgcolor="40BFF5"|35.0
|bgcolor="40BFF5"|3
|14.6
|1
|16.3
|1
|9.6
|1
|2.6
|0
|21.9
|1
|7
|-
|align="left"|Antrim Town
|bgcolor="40BFF5"|48.7
|bgcolor="40BFF5"|4
|14.7
|1
|15.6
|1
|15.2
|1
|0.0
|0
|5.8
|0
|7
|-
|- class="unsortable" class="sortbottom" style="background:#C9C9C9"
|align="left"| Total
|38.5
|8
|21.0
|4
|16.3
|3
|8.5
|2
|5.3
|1
|10.4
|1
|19
|-
|}

Districts results

Antrim North West

1989: 2 x SDLP, 1 x UUP, 1 x DUP
1993: 2 x SDLP, 1 x UUP, 1 x DUP, 1 x Sinn Féin
1989-1993 Change: Sinn Féin gain from UUP

Antrim South East

1989: 4 x UUP, 2 x DUP, 1 x SDLP
1993: 3 x UUP, 1 x DUP, 1 x SDLP, 1 x Alliance, 1 x Independent Unionist
1989-1993 Change: Alliance gain from UUP, Independent Unionist leaves DUP

Antrim Town

1989: 4 x UUP, 1 x DUP, 1 x SDLP, 1 x Alliance
1993: 4 x UUP, 1 x DUP, 1 x SDLP, 1 x Alliance
1989-1993 Change: No change

References

Antrim Borough Council elections
Antrim